The Vinery Stud Stakes, registered as the Storm Queen Stakes, is an Australian Turf Club Group 1 Thoroughbred horse race for three-year-old fillies at set weights run over a distance of 2,000 metres at Rosehill Gardens Racecourse, Sydney, Australia. Total prizemoney is A$500,000.

History
The race was named in honour of Storm Queen, the winner of the 1966 Golden Slipper Stakes. The race is the main lead-up race for the Australian Oaks.

Name
1979–1991: Storm Queen Stakes 
1992–2001: Ansett Australia Stakes 
2002–2008: Arrowfield Stud Stakes 
2009: Vinery Stud Storm Queen Stakes
2010–2013: Vinery Stud Stakes

Distance
1979: 1900 metres
1980–2021: 2000 metres
2022: 1850 metres
2023 onwards – 2000 metres

Grade

1979: Principal race
1980–1992: Group 2
1993–present: - Group 1

Venue

2022 - Newcastle Racecourse

Winners

 2022 - Fangirl 
2021 - Hungry Heart 
2020 - Shout The Bar 
2019 - Verry Elleegant
2018 - Hiyaam
2017 - Montoya's Secret
2016 - Single Gaze
 2015 - Fenway
 2014 - Lucia Valentina
 2013 - Norzita
 2012 - Mosheen
 2011 - Mirjulisa Lass
 2010 - Faint Perfume
 2009 - Purple
 2008 - Heavenly Glow
 2007 - Miss Finland
 2006 - Serenade Rose
 2005 - Hollow Bullet
 2004 - Special Harmony
 2003 - Shower Of Roses
 2002 - Sixty Seconds
 2001 - Tempest Morn
 2000 - Hill Of Grace
 1999 - Savannah Success
 1998 - Champagne
 1997 - Danendri
 1996 - Saleous
 1995 - Northwood Plume
 1994 - Alcove
 1993 - Slight Chance
 1992 - Electrique
 1991 - All Mine
 1990 - A Little Kiss
 1989 - Research
 1988 - Tennessee Vain
 1987 - Appreciation
 1986 - English Mint
 1985 - Centaurea
 1984 - Lotka's Star
 1983 - English Wonder
 1982 - Sheraco
 1981 - Evening Mist
 1980 - Lady Capri
 1979 - Impede

See also
 List of Australian Group races
 Group races

External links 
First three placegetters Vinery Stud Stakes (ATC)

References

Group 1 stakes races in Australia
Flat horse races for three-year-old fillies